Medisafe International is a United Kingdom-based company that develops and manufactures products in the field of surgical instrument reprocessing. In 1985, Medisafe introduced the Sonic Irrigation technology to the medical device market. The company has a representation with manufacturing sites in the UK and offices in Florida, Hamburg, Oslo, Buenos Aires and Malta. Medisafe International won the Millennium Price in Great Britain.

History

Established in 1991, Medisafe is a specialist manufacturer of stainless steel medical equipment, which has been working in the instrument reprocessing area since 1985. As of 2009, Medisafe is an ISO9001 / ISO13485 registered company with five factories in the UK and sales to over 60 countries. The company provides numerous machines, instrument care products and cleaning chemistries in healthcare facilities.

In 1999, Medisafe America LLC was opened to cover the US market from its base in Florida, followed by Medisafe Germany GmbH in 2002. These operate as sales service and support operations. There is also a regional office in Norway. The base in Oslo manages the Scandinavian/Japanese markets.

In 2005, a new in house research and development facility was opened in the UK to increase the speed control and flexibility over new product design. 3D CAD technology is used to validate designs before prototyping and then manufacture.

Innovation

Sonic Irrigation
Sonic Irrigation uses a combination of ultrasonic technology and a complex flushing system to ensure that all internal and external areas of complex and critical surgical instruments are cleaned.  By combining the flushing and ultrasonics, the three elements of an effective cleaning process are achieved inside the surgical instrument; namely: dilution, detergent and mechanical action.

The absence of any one of these parameters in ANY cleaning process (washing the car, washing the dishes, the dog or even having a shower) will lead to a poor cleaning result.  The flushing of a surgical instrument by itself is not sufficient to remove bio-burden as flushing alone does not produce a mechanical action.  It is only when we combine the flushing (dilution & detegent) with ultrasonics (mechanical action) that we can successfully remove debris from the lumens and channels of instruments used for Minimal Invasive/Key Hole Surgery.

The ultrasonic portion of the process can be thought of as millions of scrubbing brushes working to break down the residues left behind by the surgical process.

Medisafe's Sonic Irrigation process parameters has been recognized as an effective method for reprocessing instruments manufactured by Boss and Conmed.  As well as that, the Medisafe SI PCF System has been tested and validated for cleaning da Vinci EndoWrist instruments.

The elimination of transmissible agents such as bacteria, viruses and spore forms can be achieved through the usage of chemicals, low and high pressure, appropriate temperatures, ultrasonics and irrigation.
Sonic irrigation is widely recognized across the world as an effective means for successfully cleaning instruments prior to disinfection and sterilization.

It is understood in the instrument reprocessing fraternity that an instrument must be clean before it is disinfected and sterilized.  A dirty instrument can never be considered sterile!  This means that residues must be removed from all parts of the instruments…any remaining residues on an instrument will form a barrier to effective sterilization.

The Sonic Irrigation process is the appropriate method for cleaning instruments used in laparoscopic surgery, arthroscopic surgery, orthopedic surgery, ophthalmic surgery among others.  It is also fair to say that the Sonic Irrigation process isn’t to be used for flexible and rigid endoscopes or instruments such as Phaco handpieces used in Cataract procedures.

Fine lumen cleaner
Medisafe's fine lumen cleaner was awarded for the Millennium Product. Millennium Products set out to find examples of the best in British design, creativity and innovation. To attain the Millennium Product Status, products and services had to open up new opportunities, be environmentally responsible, demonstrate the application of new technology and solve a key problem. 
The Sonic Irrigator was the first instrument reprocessing system to address the increasing challenges of complex, critical instrument cleaning/decontamination.
The company manufactures in an Amtac ISO 9001, ISO 13485 quality environments to UL, CSA, CE requirements, complying with ISO 15883 - HTM2030 standards, guidelines for washer disinfectors and IEC 60601-1 Electrical safety standards. The technology of Medisafe’s dual performance Niagara W/D, with both Sonic Irrigation and conventional washing/disinfection is a successful contribution in advanced surgical instrument reprocessing.

See also
Instruments used in general surgery

References

External links

Medical technology companies of the United Kingdom
Surgical instrument manufacturers
Companies based in East Hertfordshire District
Manufacturing companies established in 1991
1991 establishments in the United Kingdom